Talagante Province is one of six provinces of the Santiago Metropolitan Region in central Chile. The most northeastern part of the province is included in the Santiago conurbation.

Administration
As a province, Talagante is a second-level administrative division of Chile, governed by a provincial delegate who is appointed by the president.

Communes
The province comprises five communes (Spanish: comunas), each governed by a municipality consisting of an alcalde and municipal council:
Isla de Maipo
El Monte
Padre Hurtado
Peñaflor
Talagante

Geography and demography
According to the 2002 census, Talagante was the fourth most populous province in the region with a total population of 188,572. At that time, there were 188,572 people living in urban areas, 28,877 living in rural areas, 107,935 men, and 109,514 women.

References

External links
 

Provinces of Chile
Provinces of Santiago Metropolitan Region